Ireneusz Kwieciński (born 26 March 1974) is a Polish judoka.

Achievements

See also
Judo competitions in Poland

References

External links

Polish male judoka
1974 births
Living people
Place of birth missing (living people)
20th-century Polish people